Frank Cunningham may refer to:
Frank Cunningham (politician), Canadian lawyer and public servant
Frank Cunningham (cricketer) (born 1962), Jamaican cricketer
Frank Cunningham (rally driver), see Sno*Drift
Frank Cunningham, actor in Jesse James' Women

See also
Francis Cunningham (disambiguation)